The great bent-winged bat (Miniopterus tristis) is a species of vesper bat in the family Miniopteridae. It can be found in  Indonesia, Papua New Guinea, Philippines, Solomon Islands, and Vanuatu.

References

Miniopteridae
Bats of Oceania
Bats of Southeast Asia
Bats of Indonesia
Mammals of Papua New Guinea
Mammals of the Philippines
Mammals of the Solomon Islands
Mammals of Western New Guinea
Least concern biota of Oceania
Taxa named by George Robert Waterhouse
Mammals described in 1845
Taxonomy articles created by Polbot
Bats of New Guinea